Major Stephen C. Reich (May 22, 1971 – June 28, 2005) was an American soldier and Minor League Baseball player who was killed in action while on a rescue mission in Afghanistan at age 34. Reich played for the "Team USA" baseball team in 1993, and has more wins than any other pitcher in the history of the United States Military Academy.

Biography
Born in Solon, Ohio and raised in Connecticut, Reich was the star pitcher at Shepaug Valley High School, a left-hander who led the varsity baseball team to a state championship in 1987 where he pitched and won the championship game. He led the team back to title contention in 1989. Coming out of high school, Reich was a highly touted pitching prospect, but he chose the military over professional baseball.

Reich attended the United States Military Academy where he pitched for the Army baseball team. Reich was a star pitcher for Army and holds the record for most wins by a West Point pitcher. "He was one of the best to ever come through here," said Bob Beretta, a spokesman for the Army baseball team. "When we say someone here is the best since, it's always the best since Steve Reich."

Reich was known for his fastball and command, rarely walking a batter. He signed with the Baltimore Orioles organization in 1996 after completing two years of a four-year military commitment, and pitched two games for their Class–A High Desert Mavericks affiliate in that year before being recalled by the Army.

Even after his initial military commitment ended, Reich was a highly touted pitcher, but he chose military service over professional baseball.

In 1993, Reich was named to the "Team USA" baseball team. He carried the American flag while representing Team USA in 1993 at the World University Games. He made 17 appearances for Team USA playing in Italy, Nicaragua and Cuba and at the World University Games.

In 1996, Reich was ordered to Germany. He served in Operation Allied Force in Hungary, Bosnia, Albania, and Kosovo.

Reich served four tours of duty in Afghanistan and was killed in action on June 28, 2005 during Operation Red Wings to rescue a four-man Navy SEAL team. Reich was one of 16 troops (8 Nightstalkers & 8 Navy SEALs) aboard an Army Special Operations MH-47 Chinook helicopter that was struck by a rocket-propelled grenade in the mountains of eastern Afghanistan's Kunar province. This mission was described in the book, Lone Survivor by Marcus Luttrell.  Reich was assigned to 3rd Battalion 160th Special Operations Aviation Regiment (Airborne) from Hunter Army Airfield, Georgia.

Awards and decorations
During his military career, Reich was awarded the following:

 4 Overseas Service Bars.

References

External links
Article on Reich
Audio Tribute to Reich from NPR
Baseball's Greatest Sacrifice website
From Reich's friends and classmates
Newspaper article from Voices on Reich
Newspaper article on Reich
Reich's Official Biographical Sketch
West Point biography, photographs and press release on Reich

1971 births
2005 deaths
American military personnel killed in the War in Afghanistan (2001–2021)
United States Army personnel of the War in Afghanistan (2001–2021)
Baseball players from Ohio
High Desert Mavericks players
Baseball players from Connecticut
United States Military Academy alumni
United States Army officers
American Senior Army Aviators
United States Army personnel of the Kosovo War